Alexandra Andreyevna Ievleva (born 9 December 1987) is a Russian former competitive figure skater. She is the 2007 Russian national silver medalist and competed at the 2007 European Championships. She retired from competition in 2011.

Programs

Competitive highlights 
GP: Grand Prix; JGP: Junior Grand Prix

References

External links 

 

1987 births
Living people
People from Kansk
Russian female single skaters
Competitors at the 2009 Winter Universiade
Sportspeople from Krasnoyarsk Krai